253 Squadron may refer to:

No. 253 Squadron RAF
VMGRT-253, USMC
253 Squadron (Israel), Israeli Air Force